Wyndham William Knight (5 December 1828 – 17 September 1918), known in some sources as Wiliam Wyndham Knight, was an English amateur cricketer who played in one first-class cricket match for Kent County Cricket Club in 1862.

Knight was born at Chawton in Hampshire in 1828 and educated at Winchester College. He is known to have played cricket twice for the amateur Gentlemen of Kent side in the 1850s before making his only first-class appearance for the county side in 1862 against Sussex. He was one of the founders of the Band of Brothers, an amateur cricket club closely associated with Kent.

Knight lived at Bilting House near Godmersham in Kent for most of his adult life, although he is known to have owned property in Hampshire. In 1846 he was commissioned as a second lieutenant in the Rifle Brigade, serving in the regiment until 1854, commanding a company at the Battle of Boomplaats in South Africa in 1848 and rising to the rank of lieutenant. He later served with the Royal East Kent Yeomanry between 1856 and 1862, rising to the rank of captain. He was a magistrate and a justice of the peace, married Henrietta Armstrong and had two children.

Knight died at Bilting in Kent in 1918 aged 89. His brother Philip, father Edward, and uncles George, Brook and Henry all played first-class cricket.

He was the father of Captain William Brodnax Knight, of the Queen's Bays, and the grandfather of Major-General Sir Wyndham Charles Knight, of the Indian Army.

Notes

References

External links
 

1828 births
1918 deaths
English cricketers
Kent cricketers
People from Godmersham
People from Chawton